Clericalism is the application of the formal, church-based, leadership or opinion of ordained clergy in matters of either the Church or broader political and sociocultural import.

Clericalism is usually, if not always, used in a pejorative sense.

Definitions, descriptions

Merriam Webster defines clericalism as 
"a policy of maintaining or increasing the power of a religious hierarchy". Pope Francis in his address to the Synod Fathers at Synod2018 described clericalism thusly:

According to Toronto priest Fr. Thomas Rosica, Pope Francis uses "clericalism" to mean a kind of "ecclesiastical narcissism," as well as a "club mentality and a corrupt system of cronyism."

Clericalism is often used to pejoratively denote ecclesiolatry, that is excessive devotion to the institutional aspects of an organized religion, usually over and against the religion's own beliefs or faith. This means that all issues, even those that may be beyond the religion's jurisdiction, must be addressed by either clergy or their supporters. Clericalism is also used to describe the cronyism and cloistered political environment of hierarchical religions, usually Christian denominational hierarchy, and mainly in reference to the Roman Catholic Church.

Anthony Pogorelc writes that clericalism is a social phenomenon and product of organizational development in which elites/officials exercise domination over the subordinate members and structures in religious institutions. 
 Earlier uses
In earlier times clericalism referred to the application of church-based theory or thought to secular issues. This was not necessarily referring to a lack of  separation of church and state—which is not truly involving of clericalism—but to inward looking and cloistered church leadership which answered only to itself, or who involved themselves  in matters beyond the internal concerns of their church.
 Outside Catholicism
Outside of Catholicism, clericalism is used to denote the divisions between ordained clergy and lay leaders in some Christian denominations.  Outside of Christianity,  clericalism is not restricted to the ordained (e.g., priests, ministers), as it occurs in purely secular guilds, such as academia, the legal and medical establishments, and the public-safety clergy, i.e., the police and military.

Origin 
Journalist and former priest James Carroll, argues that the original Christians had no priests and argues that the essence of clericalism  lies "not in the Gospels but in the attitudes and organizational charts of the late Roman empire", which "converted to Christianity under the Emperor Constantine"  in the forth century CE.

19th century French statesman Léon Gambetta declared "clericalism is the enemy", in the belief that "freedom from ecclesial power" was "the principal objective in the battle for public freedom."

Clericalism and canon law 

In his 1520 Treatise on the New Testament, Martin Luther (1483–1546) argued that clerical arrogance towards the lay and antagonism towards other religious orders (he didn't use the word clericalism) was a result of "the laws", i.e.  canon law:

Criticism

Sex abuse by clergy
ln recent years  the scandal of sexual abuse by Catholic clergy and its coverup has been explained by clericalism – i.e. by the  division of ordained church leaders from lay followers, were the leaders create an exclusive society unto themselves.

James Carroll gives as an example of the clericalist  privileging of the priesthood in current Catholicism the fact that "Church law provides for the excommunication of any woman who attempts to say Mass,  but mandates  no such penalty for a pedophile priest". Carroll argues that clericalism – with its "cult of secrecy, its theological misogyny, and its hierarchical power" – is "the root of Roman Catholic dysfunction".

Clerical narcissism 

Two observers, a Catholic deacon (Doug McManaman) and a scholar at a Catholic university (Paul C. Vitz), argue that the Catholic priesthood suffers from clerical narcissism among some of its priests. In 2007, Mary Gail Frawley-O'Dea wrote,

One schismatic Traditionalist Catholicism group, Novus Ordo Watch (which claims  that with the Second Vatican Council the Roman Catholic Church ceased to be truly Roman Catholic and became a "Neo-Modernist sect"), defends the power of the clergy, (though it doesn't  use the term clericalism).  It contradicts James Carroll on the institution of the clergy not being found in the Gospels, quoting the Catholic Encyclopedia as saying,

Anti-clericalism

Opposition to religious authority, typically in social or political matters, and especially opposing the influence of Roman Catholicism, appeared in Catholic Europe throughout the 19th century, in various forms, and later in Canada, Cuba, and Latin America.  According to the Pew Research Center several post-communist states are current practitioners of political anti-clericalism, including Uzbekistan, Azerbaijan, Kazakhstan, Tajikistan, Kyrgyzstan, Turkmenistan, Vietnam, China and North Korea.

Organization and hierarchy of church organizations 
Much debate over clericalism appears to dwell on whether the high clergy should have as much control over church offices and functions as they do, and whether the hierarchical and authoritarian nature of the traditional Catholic systems of promotion for clergy is effective in contemporary society. Again, while the Catholic Church is most commonly at the center of issues germane to clericalism, it is not the only denomination or religion in which charges of clericalism have been brought forth by those who feel the clergy has too much influence or should be reformed. Therefore, the debate over clericalism and anti-clericalism is often really a debate over how and by whom a religious organization (denomination) should be led and directed.

In political history of various countries, distinctive radicalized forms of nationalistic clericalism or clerical nationalism (clero-nationalism or clerico-nationalism) were emerging on the far-right of the political spectrum, specially during the interwar period in the first half of 20th century.

In literature 
Clericalism was a significant theme in the 16th century Spanish novella The Life of Lazarillo de Tormes and of His Fortunes and Adversities.

See also
 Catholicism and politics
 Christian nationalism
 Clerical fascism
 Confessionalism (politics)
 Popular piety
 Religious nationalism
 Secularism
 State religion
 Theocracy

References

Literature
 
 

 
Conservatism
Right-wing ideologies